Magic Island is a 1995 Czech RPG video game developed by Arda Team and published by Signum for Amiga and Amiga CD32.

External links 

 Amiga Format preview
 Amiga Format preview 2
 Amiga Games review
 Riki preview
 Level review
 Score review
 Excalibur review
 Riki review

1995 video games
Amiga games
Amiga CD32 games
Role-playing video games
Video games developed in the Czech Republic